This is a list of electoral results for the Melbourne Province in Victorian state elections.

Members for Melbourne Province

Election results

Elections in the 2000s

Elections in the 1990s

This election was caused by the vacancy following the resignation of Barry Pullen.

Elections in the 1980s

 Two party preferred vote was estimated.

Elections in the 1970s

 Two party preferred vote was estimated.

 This by-election was caused by the death of Jack O'Connell.

 Two party preferred vote was estimated.

Elections in the 1960s

 Two party preferred was estimated.

Two party preferred vote was estimated.

 This by-election was caused by the death of Fred Thomas.

Elections in the 1950s

Maurie Sheehy was elected in 1952 as a member of Labor, then defected to the DLP in 1955.

References

Victoria (Australia) state electoral results by district